The Ministry of Justice of Benin provide public safety and legal services that "promote the rule of law, ensure the safety and security of the public and uphold the interest of the government and people of the Republic of Benin." According to Article 6 of the Law on the Statute of the Judiciary, the Minister of Justice is the direct superior of the Magistrates of the Public Prosecutor's Office and the Central Administration of the Ministry of Justice. With reference to past records, the minister's title has been Minister of Justice and Legislation and Minister of Justice, Legislative Affairs and Human Rights.

List of ministers (Mainly post-1960 when the country achieved independence) 

 Louis Ignacio-Pinto (1958-1959)*
Emile Poisson (1959)*
Joseph Adjignon Keke (1960-1963)*
Alexandre Adande (1964-1965)*
Arsine Kinde (1966)*
Gregois Gbenou (1967)*
Vincent Guezodje (1967)*
 Barthelemy Ohouens (1968)*
 Louis Joseph Chasme (1968)*
Issaka Dangou (1969)*
Benoit Sinzogan (1970-1971)*
Michel Toko (1972)*
Barthelemy Ohouens (1973-1975)*
 Moriba Djibril (1976-1980)
Michel Alladaye (1980-1982)
Francois Dossou (1983-1984)
Didier Dassi (1985-1987)
Saliou Aboudou (1988-1989)
Yves Yehouessi (1990-1994)
Grace d'Almeida (1995-1996) [1st female]
Ismael Tidjani Serpos (1997-1998)
Joseph Gnonlonfoun (1998-2003)
Dorothé Sossa (2003-2006)
Anani Kassa Gazard (2007-2008)
Victor Topanou (2008-2010)
Marie-Elise Gbèdo (2011-2013)
Valentin Djènontin (2013-2016)
Joseph Djogbenou (2016-2018)
Sévérin Quenum (2018–present)

*The country was known as Dahomey until 1975 when its name was changed to Benin.

See also 

 Justice ministry
 Politics of Benin

References 

Justice ministries
Government of Benin